The DZFoot d'Or is a football award, created in 2000 by the Algerian football website DZFoot.com, the leading source of Algerian football news. The award is given annually to the Algerian player considered to have performed the best over the previous year.

DZFoot d'Or Winners

External links
 DZFoot d'Or history

Association football trophies and awards
Football in Algeria
2000 establishments in Algeria
Awards established in 2000
Algerian awards
Annual events in Algeria